"Miracle on Evergreen Terrace" is the tenth episode of the ninth season of the American animated television series The Simpsons. It originally aired on the Fox network in the United States on December 21, 1997. Bart accidentally ruins Christmas for the Simpson family by burning down the tree and all their presents.

It was written by Ron Hauge, directed by Bob Anderson, and guest starred Alex Trebek as himself. Hauge was inspired to write the episode after learning of an orphanage that had been ripped off. The episode was included, among other Christmas themed episodes of the series, on a 2005 Christmas special boxed set on DVD.

Plot
Homer and Marge go Christmas shopping at a Try-N-Save megastore, where frenzied shoppers are snatching the holiday season's most popular toys. Homer, posing as a store cashier, buys toys that customers tried to buy from him.

At bedtime on Christmas Eve, the family makes last-minute preparations at home, Marge tells everyone that no one can open their presents until 7 AM the next morning and confiscates all of the alarm clocks. However, Bart drinks 12 glasses of water to wake up early and unwrap his gifts, one of which is a remote-controlled fire truck. He plays with it until it sprays water on an overloaded electrical socket, causing a fire that engulfs and melts the plastic Christmas tree and all of the presents beneath it. Bart hides the evidence beneath the snow in the front yard.

When the family comes downstairs to find the tree and presents gone, Bart makes up a story about how he caught a burglar taking off with their tree and presents. The police investigate and Kent Brockman does a human interest story on the case.

As a result of the report, everyone in Springfield gives them a new Christmas tree and $15,000. With the donations, Homer buys a new car. Driving it home, Homer gets stuck behind The Plow King and impatiently passes it. He drives the car onto a frozen lake, forcing everyone to jump out. The ice cracks, causing the car to sink and blow up.

The next morning, a guilt-ridden Bart admits the truth to his family. Though furious, they go along with the lie when Brockman and his news crew arrive to do a follow-up story. When a cameraman, with help from Santa's Little Helper, finds the tree's remains, the family is forced to explain the truth; Springfield's citizens, feeling scammed, shun them in public and mail them angry letters demanding they pay back the $15,000. 

After a failed attempt by Marge to win the money as a contestant on Jeopardy!, the Simpsons arrive home to find everyone in Springfield and Alex Trebek gathered on their lawn and Marge thinks they have forgiven them. However, while that is the case, they steal all of their belongings, including Santa's Little Helper and Snowball ll, to cover the debt owed to the town. The family playfully fight over a tattered washcloth, the only thing they have left.

Production

Writer Ron Hauge said he got the idea for the episode one day when he was heading to work. He was listening to the radio and heard of an orphanage getting ripped off, and they were getting back more than they gave. The spectators in the stands during Bart's dreams are based on the likenesses of various animators.

Krusty saying "15,000 Missoulians" is a reference to Ron Hauge having lived in Missoula, Montana. The text "I'll Keell you" written on the Simpsons' car is a reference to a phrase written on a Wiffleball bat that the writers had in the office.

Cultural references
The episode has several references to Christmas films. The title is a play on Miracle on 34th Street while the scene where everyone rallies around to support the Simpsons is reminiscent of the last scene of the classic holiday movie It's a Wonderful Life. The film is further spoofed when Homer tells Lisa to stop playing the piano which parodies a similar scene involving George Bailey.

A Charlie Brown Christmas is also parodied when the senior citizens are dancing at the Springfield Retirement Castle—their dancing is based on the way the Peanuts characters dance. Marge appears as a contestant on Jeopardy! with host Alex Trebek guest starring. One of the stuffed animals Chief Wiggum is carrying is Binky from Matt Groening's comic strip Life in Hell.

Reception
In its original broadcast, "Miracle on Evergreen Terrace" finished 23rd in ratings for the week of December 15–21, 1997, with a Nielsen rating of 9.8, equivalent to approximately 9.6 million viewing households. It was the second highest-rated show on the Fox network that week, following King of the Hill.

The authors of the book I Can't Believe It's a Bigger and Better Updated Unofficial Simpsons Guide said "A deliberately mawkish Christmas episode that is low on good jokes (although the Simpsons watching their own fire on television is a good start) and a retread of any number of episodes where Bart does wrong, feels guilty and eventually has to fess up. The only real ray of sunshine is the closing moments when the neighbours get their revenge but the Simpsons find the family spirit after all."

In its review of a 2005 DVD boxed set of Christmas themed episodes of The Simpsons, The Journal described "Simpsons Roasting on an Open Fire", "Miracle On Evergreen Terrace", "Skinner's Sense of Snow", and "Dude, Where's My Ranch?" among memorable episodes of the series.

In his review of the same DVD, Digitally Obsessed critic Joel Cunningham wrote that "Miracle on Evergreen Terrace" is "a good one [...] A nice combo of humor, satire, and heartwarming holiday fuzzies". Andy Dougan wrote in Evening Times that the episode is "one of the darkest, blackest Christmas cartoons ever animated".

References

External links

 
 

American Christmas television episodes
The Simpsons (season 9) episodes
1997 American television episodes
Jeopardy!